Maximikha is a rural locality (a village) in Kubenskoye Rural Settlement, Kharovsky District, Vologda Oblast, Russia. The population was 1 as of 2002.

Geography 
Maximikha is located 21 km west of Kharovsk (the district's administrative centre) by road. Korkinskoye is the nearest rural locality.

References 

Rural localities in Kharovsky District